Sericosema is a genus of moths in the family Geometridae first described by Warren in 1895.

Species
Sericosema juturnaria (Guenée, 1857)
Sericosema immaculata (Barnes & McDunnough, 1913)
Sericosema wilsonensis Cassino & Swett, 1922
Sericosema simularia (Taylor, 1906)

References

Caberini